Rennweg is a railway station of the Vienna S-Bahn in Landstraße, the city's third district.

References 

Rennweg
Austrian Federal Railways